South China AA will seek to win their first trophy for one season after Kitchee won the Hong Kong First Division League, the Hong Kong FA Cup and Hong Kong League Cup while Sunray Cave JC Sun Hei defeated them to win the Hong Kong Senior Challenge Shield last season. South China are competing in the First Division League, Senior Shield and FA Cup this season.

Review

Pre-season
After an unsuccessful season coached by Slovak Ján Kocian, South China will like to take revenge from Kitchee, who claimed an historic treble as they won the First Division League, the League Cup and the FA Cup last season. Unlike the previous season, chairman Steven Lo did not say too much about the changes of the team. He even stopped writing blog articles after the team finished their last league game until 9 July 2012.

On 9 July 2012, chairman Steven Lo published his first blog articles for the new season. He published the new first team squad and the in-and-out player changes. He also appointed Liu Chun Fai as the new head coach, and allowed former assistant coaches Chan Chi Hong and Chan Ho Yin to leave the club. The team also started having training on the same day. However, public media are not allowed to go into the training court.

South China started having public training on 17 July 2012. Chairman Steven Lo announced that the team would go to Guangdong for training camp. The team started the training camp on 23 July 2012. However, there are no news about the team in training camp and the players did not say anything on the social networking website, until the team published a photo, showing the players watching a football match in Guangdong. Soon after, chairman Steven Lo wrote an article on his blog about the training camp. The team will play total of 6 matches with Guangdong Sunray Cave, which Hong Kong and former South China players Leung Chun Pong and Chan Siu Ki is playing in, during the training camp. By the day that Steven Lo published the blog article, the team had a great result as they won 3 matches and tied once.

While the team was having training camp in mainland China, chairman Steven Lo introduced a new player. defender Sean Tse joined the club from English Premier League club Manchester City for an undisclosed fee. Since he is holding a Hong Kong ID card, he will not be registered and counted as a foreign player.

They got their first win in recent 4 pre-season matches on 22 August 2012. Itaparica and Au Yeung Yiu Chung scored once while center defender Joel Bertoti Padilha netted twice, as the club defeated Sun Pegasus 4–0 at Tsing Yi Northeast park.

September
South China began the new season at their home ground Hong Kong Stadium, playing against J. League Division 2 club Yokohama F.C.'s satellite team Yokohama FC Hong Kong on 2 September 2012. Tsuyoshi Yoshitake scored for Yokohama FC Hong Kong at the beginning of the game, but goals from Dhiego de Souza Martins, Itaparica, Ticão and Lee Hong Lim secured the win for the club, although Lee Ka Ho of Yokohama FC Hong Kong scored at the very last minute. Just a week later, South China visited Sunray Cave JC Sun Hei at Mong Kok Stadium. Defender Lee Chi Ho and Brazilian forward Leandro Rodrigues goals was not enough to see off the defending champions of Hong Kong Senior Challenge Shield, as Mamadou Barry and Cheung Kwok Ming equalised the game for Sunray Cave JC Sun Hei. The match ended as a 2–2 tie.

They went back to their home against Citizen on 19 September 2012. Lee Chi Ho scored his second goal of the season but Festus Baise equalised 7 minutes later. Winning goal from Itaparica helped the team to win over 2–1. As they start playing the Senior Challenge Shield from the quarterfinals, they had a free weekend, having more time to prepare for the big match against Kitchee a week later at home. Having won the First Division League in the past 2 seasons, Kitchee had achieved a great result against South China in recent years. Both team struggled to make goalscoring chances in the first half, but the second half was totally a different game. Jonathan Carril's 6-yard strike should have opened the deadlock for Kitchee but his shot hit the bar. Dhiego de Souza Martins scored the winning goal for South China in the stoppage time, thanked a lovely cross from Jack Sealy. This goal also helped the team to climb at the top of the league table.

October
Head coach Liu Chun Fai made two changes to his starting XI for the visit of Wofoo Tai Po in a league match on 7 October 2012. Au Yeung Yiu Chung and Cheng Lai Hin made their first starts of the season. Lee Hong Lim scored two headers while Au Yeung Yiu Chung and Itaparica scored two goals and one goal respectively, which helped the team to stay at the top of the league for another week. This was also the second league clean sheet of the season.

Due to the FIFA international match period, South China did not feature any matches for two weeks. Moreover, a number of players was called up for the international friendly match between Hong Kong and Malaysia. Yapp Hung Fai, Lee Chi Ho, Bai He, Lee Hong Lim and Au Yeung Yiu Chung had played in the friendly match held at Mong Kok Stadium.

Back to the league after international match period, South China welcomed Southern, which was at the bottom of the league table before the match, at home. Southern had gained 2 points in last two matches, after going behind in both matches. Although South China dominated the possession and the attacks, they could not manage to score a goal due to the solid defence of Southern. The club dropped two points and dropped a place to second in the table.

South China ended October at the second place of the league table.

November
South China began November with an away match against Biu Chun Rangers at Mong Kok Stadium. Thank to goals from Mauro, Dhiego Martins and Chan Wai Ho respectively, they claimed the 3–1 victory on 4 November. Despite winning the match, South China remained at the second place, behind Kitchee. They reclaimed the first place with a tough win at home against Tuen Mun on 11 November, thank to Michael Luk's and Itaparica's goal.

South China faced rivalry club Kitchee in the Senior Challenge Shield at Hong Kong Stadium on 17 November. Midfielder Itaparica's late goal helped the team record an important victory, with Kitchee's defender Liu Quankun was sent off in the stoppage time of the second half. They soon played against each other again one week later on 25 November at Kitchee's home ground Tseung Kwan O Sports Ground. South China successfully kept a clean sheet and eliminated their rival by 1–0 in aggregate, reaching the semi-finals stage of the shield.

December
South China started the new month with a Senior Shield semi-finals 1st leg match against 2011 champions Citizen at home Hong Kong Stadium on 15 December 2013. They suffered their first defeat of the season as they lost 2–3 to Citizen. Mauro's goal in the first half help them take the lead into changing room. However, Man Pei Tak was sent off on the 67th minute and Citizen's Campion, Paulinho and Festus scored three goals in 11 minutes. Lee Wai Lim scored a goal in the stoppage time, making a narrower lead for them.

Back into the league, they faced Sun Pegasus at Yuen Long Stadium a week later on 22 December. Goals from Kwok Kin Pong, Cheng Lai Hin and Lee Wai Lim, all in the second half, helped secure the victory for them.

4 days later on 26 December, South China travelled to Mong Kok Stadium and faced Citizen for the FA Cup first round 1st leg match. An easy win by 2–0 thank to Dhiego Martins and Au Yeung Yiu Chung in the second half, as well as the second red card from Chiu Chun Kit.

January
South China travelled to Mong Kok Stadium and faced Citizen for the Senior Shield semi-finals 2nd leg, their first game in 2013. Although taking the advantage throughout the game, they failed to score and was eliminated by Citizen in aggregate.

A week later on 13 January, South China hosted Citizen at home Hong Kong Stadium for the FA Cup first round 2nd leg match. They scored five goals in the match, with Au Yeung Yiu Chung scoring twice and Alessandro Celin, Michael Luk and Mauro scoring once. They defeated Citizen by 5–1, conceding one goal from Sandro's penalty kick.

Back into the league, South China faced Wofoo Tai Po at Hong Kong Stadium on 18 January. More or less the same as last week, they defeated Wofoo Tai Po 5–1, securing themselves in the first place of the league table. A week later on 26 January, they overcame Biu Chun Rangers from 1 goals down and scored 6 goals later.

February
South China started a new month and hosted a league match against Sun Pegasus at Hong Kong Stadium on 2 February. Jaimes McKee converted a penalty kick on the 10th minute and leading South China for almost all the game. A controversial goal from Dhiego Martins in the stoppage time help South China avoid losing all three points.

Two weeks later on 17 February, South China faced Sunray Cave JC Sun Hei for the FA Cup quarter-finals 1st leg match at Hong Kong Stadium. Goals from Au Yeung Yiu Chung, Ticão and Itaparica helped secure a 3–1 victory for them.

Key Events
 12 June 2012: Hong Kong midfielder Leung Chun Pong joins China League One club Guangdong Sunray Cave F.C.
 20 June 2012: Liu Chun Fai was appointed as the new head coach of South China. On the other hand, Chan Wai Ho and Joel signed a new contract for South China.
 9 July 2012: Chairman Steven Lo announced Carlos Augusto, Leandro, Chan Cham Hei, Jack Sealy, Michael Luk, Tin Man Ho and Lee Hong Lim join the club in the new season, while Yeo Jee-Hoon, Xu Deshuai, Li Haiqiang, Chan Pak Hang, Giovane and Zhang Chunhui leave the club.
 10 July 2012: Hong Kong forward Chan Siu Ki joins China League One club Guangdong Sunray Cave F.C.
 9 August 2012: defender Sean Tse joins South China for an undisclosed fee from Manchester City. He will not be counted as a foreign player as he is holding the Hong Kong ID card and thus is a Hong Kong citizen.
 27 September 2012: Chairman Steven Lo announced that Brazilian forward Mauro Rafael da Silva joins South China for an undisclosed fee from Esportivo.
 18 December 2012: Two youngsters, Japanese Kouta Jige and Brazilian Filipe de Souza Conceicao, signed professional contracts with the club. They are also promoted to the first team. Since they are holding the Hong Kong ID cards, they are counted as local player.
 26 December 2012: Chairman Steven Lo announced that Chinese-Hongkonger Bai He joins fellow First Division team Sun Pegasus on loan until the end of season.
 29 December 2012: Brazilian free agent striker Alessandro Celin joins the club.
 10 January 2013: South China made a play exchange deal with Biu Chun Rangers. Wong Chin Hung joins Biu Chun Rangers from South China while Chak Ting Fung is transferred to South China. Both transfers are free transfers.
 20 January 2013: Irish forward Adam Tse joins South China for an undisclosed fee. Similar to his brother Sean Tse, since he is holding the Hong Kong ID card, he will not be counted as a foreign player and thus is a Hong Kong citizen.
 1 February 2013: Brazilian forward Mauro Rafael da Silva is released by the club by mutual reasons.
 16 March 2013: Taiwanese-Spanish defender Victor Chou was reported that he was having a trial with the club.
 29 March 2013: Taiwanese-Spanish defender Victor Chou joins South China as a free transfer.
 19 April 2013: South China claim the First Division League title for the first time in three seasons thank to Kitchee's draw against Sun Pegasus with two matchdays left.

Players

First team
As of 30 March 2013.

Remarks:
FP These players are registered as foreign players.

Out on Loan

Player with dual nationality
  Sean Tse (Local player)
  Michael Luk (Local player, eligible to play for Hong Kong national football team)
  Jack Sealy (Local player) 
  Bai He (Local player, eligible to play for Hong Kong national football team)
  Kouta Jige (Local player)
  Filipe de Souza Conceicao (Local player)
  Alessandro Celin

Transfers

In

Out

Loan out

Stats

Overall Stats
{|class="wikitable" style="text-align: center;"
|-
!width="100"|
!width="60"|First Division
!width="60"|Senior Shield
!width="60"|FA Cup
!width="60"|Total Stats
|-
|align=left|Games played    ||  18 ||  4  || 6  || 28
|-
|align=left|Games won       ||  11 ||  1  || 4  || 16
|-
|align=left|Games drawn     ||  3  ||  2  || 1  || 6
|-
|align=left|Games lost      ||  4  ||  1  || 1  || 6
|-
|align=left|Goals for       ||  46 ||  3  || 14 || 63
|-
|align=left|Goals against   ||  21 ||  3  || 4  || 28
|- =
|align=left|Players used    ||  26 ||  20 || 24 || 281
|-
|align=left|Yellow cards    ||  36 ||  14 || 11 || 61
|-
|align=left|Red cards       ||  6  ||  2  || 0  || 8
|-

Players Used: South China has used a total of 27 different players in all competitions.

Squad Stats

Top scorers
As of 4 May 2013

Disciplinary record
As of 4 May 2013

Captains

Competitions

Overall

First Division League

Classification

Results summary

Results by round

Matches

Pre-season

Competitive

First Division League

Remarks:
1 South China's home matches against Biu Chun Rangers was rescheduled and were played at Mong Kok Stadium instead of their usual home ground Hong Kong Stadium.
2 South China's away match against Yokohama FC Hong Kong was played at Mong Kok Stadium instead of Siu Sai Wan Sports Ground.
3 The match was abandoned after 28 minutes due to adverse weather and bad pitch conditions.
4 The replay of week 15 match against Yokohama FC Hong Kong was scheduled to be played at Siu Sai Wan Sports Ground on 4 April 2013.
5 Since the 3,500-seated main stand was all full, the 1,500 temporary stand was opened and therefore the capacity of Tseung Kwan O Sports Ground was 5,000 in the home match against South China.
6 The capacity of Aberdeen Sports Ground is originally 9,000, but only the 4,000-seated main stand is opened for football match.

Senior Challenge Shield

Quarter-finals

Semi-finals

FA Cup

First round

Quarter-finals

Semi-finals

Notes

References

South China AA seasons
Sou